Pseudochromis kristinae, the lip-stick dottyback, is a species of ray-finned fish from the Western Indian Ocean: along East Africa, around the island of Madagascar and the Comoro Islands, which is a member of the family Pseudochromidae.

Etymology
The fish is named in honor of Gill's wife Kristin.

References

Gill, A.C., 2004. Revision of the Indo-Pacific dottyback fish subfamily Pseudochrominae (Perciformes: Pseudochromidae). Smith. Monogr. (1):1-213.

kristinae
Taxa named by Anthony C. Gill
Fish described in 2004